The Hatef Higher Education Institute (HHEI) (Misish-e Âmvâzesh-e 'ali-ye Hatef) was established in 2005, under the aegis of the Iranian Ministry of Science, Research and Technology. It is located in Zahedan. The main mission of the institute is to educate students and contribute to international research in various fields of engineering comprising, among others, industrial engineering, information technology, civil engineering, electrical engineering.

References

External links 
 Official website of HHEI

Education in Sistan and Baluchestan Province
Universities in Iran